No Fear of Time is the second studio album by American hip hop duo Black Star. Entirely produced by Madlib, the album marks the duo's first full-length release in 24 years, following 1998's Mos Def and Talib Kweli Are Black Star, and was released on May 3, 2022, via podcasting network Luminary.

Background
In 1998, rappers Yasiin Bey (formerly known as Mos Def) and Talib Kweli formed the duo Black Star, releasing their debut album Mos Def & Talib Kweli Are Black Star that same year to critical acclaim. Since then, the duo went on to have greater success in their respective solo careers; while also making occasional film soundtrack/compilation appearances including The Hurricane cut "Little Brother".

In 2005, hip hop website TheSituation.co.uk reported Kweli said that a new Black Star album was "in the pipeline". In November 2011, Black Star released two new singles entitled "Fix Up" (produced by Madlib) and "You Already Knew" (produced by Oh No), the latter of which was the lead single for a planned Aretha Franklin tribute mixtape entitled Black Star Aretha. Eight years later, it was announced that a second album by Black Star was to be produced entirely by Madlib, and was confirmed to be finished in November.

Release and promotion
On April 8, 2022, Black Star officially announced that their highly anticipated second album would be titled No Fear of Time, with a scheduled release of May 3 exclusively on the podcast platform Luminary. It was also revealed in a press release by Talib Kweli that the album was recorded over a span of four years in hotel rooms and backstage at Dave Chappelle's shows.

The day after the album's announcement, the duo released a Black Thought-assisted promotional single entitled "Mineral Mountain", which used Madlib's "The New Normal" instrumental from the Sound Ancestors album.

On November 12, 2022, the duo performed "So Be It" and "The Main Thing is to Keep the Main Thing the Main Thing" on Saturday Night Live.

Critical reception

No Fear of Time was met with positive reviews from critics. At Metacritic, which assigns a normalized rating out of 100 to reviews from professional publications, the album received an average score of 79, based on five reviews.

Track listing
All lyrics are written by Yasiin Bey and Talib Kweli Greene except where noted. All songs are produced by Madlib.

Notes
 Tracks 2, 4, 5, 7, and 9 are stylized in sentence case. For example, "So Be It" is stylized as "So be it".

References

2022 albums
Albums produced by Madlib
Black Star (group) albums
Self-released albums